Robyn Ann Sisman (4 August 1949 – 20 May 2016) was a publisher and author who commissioned Robert Harris to write his 1992 novel Fatherland and produced six novels of her own.

Selected publications
Special Relationship
Just Friends
Perfect Strangers
Weekend in Paris
A Hollywood Ending
The Perfect Couple?

References

1949 births
2016 deaths
British publishers (people)
British writers